The social trinitarianism is a Christian interpretation of the Trinity as consisting of three persons in a loving relationship, which reflects a model for human relationships. 

The teaching emphasizes that God is an inherently social being. Human unity approaches conformity to the image of God's unity through self-giving, empathy, adoration for one another, etc. Such love is a fitting ethical likeness to God, but is in stark contrast to God's unity of being.

Those who are often associated with this term include Jürgen Moltmann, Miroslav Volf, Elizabeth A. Johnson, Leonardo Boff, and John Zizioulas.

Three persons
Orthodox Christian theology asserts that the one God is manifest in three 'persons' (this term was generally used in the Latin West). Social trinitarian thought argues that the three persons are each distinct realities--this was generally presented in the East with the Greek term 'hypostasis' from the First Council of Nicaea onward. Hypostasis was here employed to denote a specific individual instance of being. So, the Trinity is composed of three distinct 'persons' or 'hypostases' which are in integral relation with one another. The Cappadocian Fathers outlined the traditional set of doctrines describing the relational character of the Trinity: the Father is the Father by virtue of begetting the Son; likewise the Son is the Son precisely by being begotten. These two hypostases do not have their identity first as individual entities that then relate; rather, they are what they are precisely due to their relations. John Zizioulas is perhaps the best-known contemporary proponent of this emphasis in trinitarian theology, which he labels relational ontology.

Many proponents of the social trinitarianism, including John Zizioulas, criticize modern individualism by mapping human relationships onto this relational ontology as well. This suggests that the individual is not constituted over and against other persons. On the contrary, say these proponents, a person's identity and self are deeply constituted by their relationships, such that a person could not be the same person were it not for the relationship - the relationship, in some sense at least, precedes (ontologically, though not necessarily temporally) the person rather than the person preceding the relationship.

Two theological keys to the idea of person found in the social trinitarianism are the trinitarian concept of perichoresis ("interpenetration"--associated most strongly with Saint John of Damascus), and the Christological doctrine of two wills in one person (which was central to Maximus the Confessor's defense of orthodoxy). The doctrine of the two wills of Christ stems from the Council of Chalcedon where the Church affirmed that Jesus is fully human and fully divine, without division and yet without mixing. Thus Jesus is one person, yet with two natures, which two natures yield two wills. This was intended to combat both Nestorius's two-persons approach and the monophysite doctrine of Jesus as being so divine that his humanity was overwhelmed. This allowed the Church to affirm that Jesus was truly one person who both participated in the divine Trinitarian "economy" as well as in the human sphere of material being.

One essence
The three persons of the Trinity must not be confused as three distinct gods, an error that the name 'Trinity' itself was developed to combat: Tri-unity (as first outlined by Tertullian). All three persons/hypostases have one divine nature: their essence ("ousia" in Greek). It was in the development of the Trinity that the Greek terms ousia and hypostasis were fully separated; before the First Council of Nicaea, they had often been used interchangeably. Social Trinitarian thought argues that this one essence can be thought of as the loving relationship between Father, Son, and Spirit. This relationship can be analogized to human loving relationships; however, as mentioned above, it is a complete unity--it does not arise from the three hypostases but is intimately involved in their very ontological constitution. The idea of perichoresis of the persons of the trinity has been cited to provide at least part of this greater unity. 

It is important to note that though the Cappadocians, for example, tended to begin with the three persons and from there develop the sense of unity, while Augustine of Hippo more or less began, drawing from the Latin tradition of Tertullian, with the unity and then developed the three distinct persons (along a psychological metaphor), neither the Eastern nor the Western traditions actually see either the 3 or the 1 as ontologically prior to the other: the three are always united in and constituted by the one; the one is always expressed in the three.

See also
 Trinity
 First Council of Nicaea
 Council of Chalcedon
 Cappadocian Fathers
 John Zizioulas

Notes

Trinitarianism

fr:Trinité (sociologie)
Nature of Jesus Christ